Lower Jurala Hydro Electric Project is a major on-going Hydro Electric Project near Mulamalla Village, Atmakur Mandal, Jogulamba Gadwal district, Telangana.  The project construction was started in 2008, planned to completed it by 2014. But due to the delay it may completed by end of 2015. There will be 6 units, each can produce 40 MW power. The first unit was synchronized in December 2013 and the second unit was synchronized in January 2014 and connected to the grid.

Due to the quality issues in gates, along with units 1&2,unit-3 nearing erection completion and assemblies in various stages were inundated on 30 July 2014 late night flood water released from Jurala Project.

Units 3 and 4 were commissioned and declared of commercial operation of 40 MW each unit on 28 July 2016 confirmed by Mr. Venkata Rajam, COD Hydel,  Telangana State Genco.

See also

 List of hydroelectric power station failures

References

External links
 http://tsgenco.telangana.gov.in/
 http://www.varksengineers.com/ongoing.html
 https://web.archive.org/web/20130531061601/http://www.cea.nic.in/archives/hydro/proj_mon/proj_status/jun12.pdf
 http://www.thehindubusinessline.com/news/states/jurala-power-project/article6266917.ece
 http://www.thehindubusinessline.com/companies/ts-genco-commissions-unit-34-of-lower-jurala-hydroelectric-project/article8928676.ece

2014 establishments in Telangana
Dams in Telangana
Hydroelectric power stations in Telangana